Stanley "Sonny" Gallant (born March 27, 1956) is a Canadian politician who served as interim leader of the Prince Edward Island Liberal Party from 2019 to 2022. He was elected to the Legislative Assembly of Prince Edward Island in the 2007 provincial election. He represents the electoral district of Evangeline-Miscouche and is a member of the Liberal Party. On February 15, 2017, Gallant was appointed to the Executive Council of Prince Edward Island as Minister of Workforce and Advanced Learning. He was chosen interim leader of the Liberal Party on September 16, 2019.

Electoral record

References

External links
 Biography at Legislative Assembly of Prince Edward Island

Living people
People from Prince County, Prince Edward Island
Prince Edward Island Liberal Party MLAs
Acadian people
21st-century Canadian politicians
Members of the Executive Council of Prince Edward Island
1956 births